Porton railway station served the village of Porton, in Wiltshire, England, from 1854 to 1968 on the West of England line.

History 
The station was opened on 3 July 1854, along with the line from Andover to Milford. It closed on 9 September 1968. The station was serviced by a goods yard, which closed in 1962.

Between 1916 and 1946 the Porton Down Camp Military Railway (2 foot gauge) ran between the goods yard at Porton station and the camp, almost a mile to the northeast.

Proposed reopening
A proposal was made to reopen the station to service the Porton Down science park. However, reopening the station was not seen as economically viable, as it was estimated that the reopening would cost £6m, and would affect the timetables for the line, thus affecting services to the other stations on the line. It was instead decided that a shuttle bus would run in between the science park and Grateley railway station.

References 

Disused railway stations in Wiltshire
Former London and South Western Railway stations
Beeching closures in England
Railway stations in Great Britain opened in 1854
Railway stations in Great Britain closed in 1968